"One Armed Scissor" is the debut single by American post-hardcore band At the Drive-In, released in 2000 from their album Relationship of Command. It was the first At the Drive-In song to be played regularly on a number of radio stations. The song reached No. 26 on the Billboard Alternative Songs chart and No. 64 on the UK Singles Chart. It was also the encore song of their 2016 reunion tour.

Background
According to a Channel V interview, a one-armed scissor is a mixture of "red bull and vodka", and that the song is about their tours told from the omniscient character named the one-armed scissor who sees their hardships they deal with while on tour.

This song, along with the B-side "Incetardis", was selected to be put on the compilation This Station Is Non-Operational, which itself was named after one of "One Armed Scissor"'s lyrics.

Videos
The music video for this song contains all footage from live shows and the road in general. A second version of the video was also released with the Fearless Records compilation This Station Is Non-Operational containing more live footage, as well as studio footage.

Track listing
 "One Armed Scissor" – 3:45
 "Pattern Against User" – 3:18
 "Incetardis" – 3:26

In popular culture
The song was listed at No. 255 on Pitchfork's "Top 500 Songs of the 2000s". The song was also ranked #1 on Alternative Press's "Haircut 100" list of the top 100 singles of the 2000s. A BBC Music review hailed "One Armed Scissor" as one of the "most invigorating rock songs released in the last 20 or 30 years, let alone the past 10." In October 2011, NME placed it at number 113 on its list "150 Best Tracks of the Past 15 Years".
"One Armed Scissor" is featured in the music video games Guitar Hero World Tour and Rock Band 3 as a playable track.
Alternative Press listed "One Armed Scissor" as the decade's "contemporary punk/emo scene's best single" out of one hundred others.

Charts

References

External links
 

2000 songs
2000 debut singles
At the Drive-In songs